Hayley Carter and Luisa Stefani were the defending champions but chose not to participate.

Aldila Sutjiadi and Kateryna Volodko won the title, defeating Jada Hart and Dalayna Hewitt in the final, 7–5, 6–3.

Seeds

Draw

Draw

References

External Links
Main Draw

Lexington Challenger - Doubles
2022 Women's Doubles